Rosemount is a city in Dakota County, Minnesota, United States, on the southern edge of the Twin Cities Metropolitan Area. The population was 25,650 at the 2020 census.

History
Rosemount was established as a township in 1858 and incorporated as a city in 1972, encompassing the old village of Rosemount and Pine Bend. According to the city's website, there was some debate over whether to name the township Saratoga or Rosemount, with the latter finally chosen to reflect the town's Irish heritage and remain in keeping with the name given to the post office a few years earlier. In the 1940s it was home to a military gunpowder plant, Gopher Ordnance Works.

The community of Rich Valley was on today's 140th street. It had a post office from 1858 to 1935, and a Chicago Great Western depot.

Geography

U.S. Highway 52, Minnesota Highway 3, Minnesota Highway 55, and County Road 42 are four of the main routes in Rosemount.

Demographics

Rosemount is the home of the Rosemount High School "Irish" and Dakota County Technical College, a member of the Minnesota State Colleges and Universities system.

2010 census
As of the census of 2010, there were 21,874 people, 7,587 households, and 5,918 families living in the city. The racial makeup of the city was 87.3% White, 3.0% African American, 0.4% Native American, 5.6% Asian, 1.1% from other races, and 2.6% from two or more races. Hispanic or Latino of any race were 3.1% of the population.

There were 7,587 households, of which 46.5% had children under the age of 18 living with them, 65.0% were married couples living together, 8.9% had a female householder with no husband present, 4.0% had a male householder with no wife present, and 22.0% were non-families. 16.6% of all households were made up of individuals, and 5.2% had someone living alone who was 65 years of age or older. The average household size was 2.88 and the average family size was 3.27.

The median age in the city was 34.7 years. 30.7% of residents were under the age of 18; 6.8% were between the ages of 18 and 24; 29.8% were from 25 to 44; 25.2% were from 45 to 64; and 7.7% were 65 years of age or older. The gender makeup of the city was 49.4% male and 50.6% female.

2000 census
As of the census of 2000, there were 14,619 people, 4,742 households, and 3,931 families living in the city. The city's racial makeup was 92.78% White, 2.03% African American, 0.30% Native American, 2.13% Asian, 0.80% from other races, and 1.96% from two or more races. Hispanics or Latinos of any race were 1.83% of the population.

There were 4,742 households, of which 52.4% had children under the age of 18 living with them, 70.1% were married couples living together, 9.1% had a female householder with no husband present, and 17.1% were non-families. 13.0% of all households were made up of individuals, and 4.0% had someone living alone who was 65 years of age or older. The average household size was 3.08 and the average family size was 3.38.

In the city, the population was spread out, with 35.1% under the age of 18, 6.3% from 18 to 24, 36.5% from 25 to 44, 16.8% from 45 to 64, and 5.4% who were 65 years of age or older. The median age was 31 years. For every 100 females, there were 99.1 males. For every 100 females age 18 and over, there were 96.6 males.

The median income for a household in the city was $65,916, and the median income for a family was $68,929 (these figures had risen to $83,826 and $90,644 respectively as of a 2007 estimate). Males had a median income of $45,567 versus $33,247 for females. The per capita income for the city was $23,116. About 2.2% of families and 3.3% of the population were below the poverty line, including 3.2% of those under age 18 and 6.8% of those age 65 or over.

Politics
Rosemount is in Minnesota's 2nd congressional district, represented by Angie Craig, a Democrat.

 State Representative: John Huot (Democrat)
 State Senator: Greg Clausen (Democrat)
 County Commissioner: District 4 Joe Atkins, District 7 Chris Gerlach (Republican)
 Mayor: Bill Droste (Republican)
 Council: Heidi Freske, Jeff Weisensel, Paul Essler, Tammy Block
 City Administrator: Logan Martin
 Assistant City Administrator: Emmy Foster

Events
Despite Rosemount's relatively small population, it is the only multiple-time host of the USA Broomball National Championships, welcoming competing teams in 2001, 2002, 2003, and 2005. Three different rinks in the area have hosted games in the men's and co-rec divisions. Rosemount also holds Leprechaun Days, a 10-day community festival with many events.

Schools
 Dakota County Technical College
 Rosemount Elementary School
 Shannon Park Elementary School
 Rosemount Middle School
 Rosemount High School
 Saint Joseph Catholic School
 Rosemount First Baptist School

Notable people
 Robert M. Boche, Wisconsin State Assemblyman
 JT Brown, NHL Player with the Minnesota Wild
 Pierce Butler, Associate Justice of the US Supreme Court
 Tom Compton, Offensive lineman, NFL
 Kirk Cousins, Quarterback, NFL
 Mike Morris, Retired Long-snapper, Minnesota Vikings
 Payton Otterdahl, Olympic Athlete
 Tom Preissing, Retired NHL defenseman
 Mike 'The Marine' Richman, Bellator Featherweight
 Lona Williams, writer/actress/producer

References

External links
 City of Rosemount – Official Website
 Dakota County Website

Cities in Dakota County, Minnesota
Cities in Minnesota
Populated places established in 1856
Minnesota populated places on the Mississippi River